Sayed Anwar Sadat is an ethnic Uzbek politician in Afghanistan. He served as governor of Faryab Province from 2015 to 2017.

Early life 
Sayed Anwar Sadat was born in 1971 in the province of Sar-e Pol, Afghanistan.
Sadat graduated from school in Sar-e Pol Province. He received his undergraduate degree in journalism from Istanbul University in Turkey in 2001.

References 

Living people
1971 births
Governors of Faryab Province
Afghan Uzbek politicians
People from Sar-e Pol Province